Xenomorphia is an extinct genus of parasitoid wasp comprising two species: X. resurrecta (the type species) and X. handschini. The generic name is in reference to the parasitic Xenomorph creature starring in the Alien franchise. The wasp's first fossils were discovered in Oligocene (Chattian) aged phosphorite mines located in the former Quercy province of France, the remains of 55 ancient fly (Phoridae) pupae were found preserved with Xenomorphia wasps inside of them, recording a parasitic relationship between the two insects. Along with the two Xenomorphia wasp species, two other new wasp taxa were identified, Coptera anka, and Palaeortona quercyensis.

References 

Parasitica
†Xenomorphia
Prehistoric Hymenoptera genera
Oligocene insects
Oligocene animals of Europe
Paleogene France
Fossils of France
Quercy Phosphorites Formation
Fossil taxa described in 2018
†